Cairo Rail Bridge is the name of two bridges crossing the Ohio River near Cairo, Illinois in the United States. The original was an 1889 George S. Morison through-truss and deck truss bridge, replaced by the current bridge in 1952. The second and current bridge is a through-truss bridge that reused many of the original bridge piers. As of 2018, trains like the City of New Orleans travel over the Ohio River supported by the same piers whose construction began in 1887.

Original bridge

On July 1, 1887, construction began on the first caisson for the foundations of the bridge piers. Despite increased precautions following the deaths, a total of five men died of decompression sickness during construction. February 19, 1889, the last pier was completed. The first train crossed the bridge from Illinois to Kentucky on October 29, 1889. Work continued until it was turned over to the railroad on March 1, 1890. Total cost of the structure exceeded $2.6 million, with nearly $1.2 million for the substructure alone. The bridge, substructure and superstructure weighed 194.6 million pounds (88,270 t), excluding the approaches.

On October 31, 1895, a magnitude 6.6 earthquake on the New Madrid Seismic Zone  with an epicenter at Charleston, Missouri, cracked a pier on the bridge.  The quake is the biggest quake since the 1812 New Madrid earthquake which at 8.3 was the biggest recorded quake in the contiguous United States.

Cairo bridge's two  main spans were the longest pin-connected Whipple truss spans ever built. At the time, the bridge was the largest and most expensive ever undertaken in the United States. At , it was the longest metallic structure in the world. Its total length was  including wooden approach trestles. Its construction completed the first rail link between Chicago and New Orleans and revolutionized north-south rail travel along the Mississippi River.

See also
List of bridges documented by the Historic American Engineering Record in Illinois

References

Further reading

External links

Cairo Ohio River Bridge at Bridges & Tunnels

 includes information about the Cairo Rail Bridge
 Illinois Central Railroad Bridge at Illinois Historic Sites Inventory
 Historic Bridges of the United States (original bridge)
 Historic Bridges of the United States (second bridge)

Canadian National Railway bridges in the United States
Bridges completed in 1889
Railroad bridges in Illinois
Railroad bridges in Kentucky
Bridges over the Ohio River
Historic American Engineering Record in Illinois
Illinois Central Railroad
Cairo, Illinois
Bridges in Alexander County, Illinois
Whipple truss bridges in the United States
Iron bridges in the United States
1889 establishments in Kentucky
1889 establishments in Illinois